Eleanor Steber (July 17, 1914October 3, 1990) was an American operatic soprano. Steber is noted as one of the first major opera stars to have achieved the highest success with training and a career based in the United States.

Biography

Eleanor Steber was born in Wheeling, West Virginia on July 17, 1914.  She was the daughter of William Charles Steber, Sr. (1888–1966) and Ida Amelia (née Nolte) Steber (1885–1985).  She had two younger siblings – William Charles Steber, Jr. (1917–2002) and Lucile Steber Leslie (1918–1999).  She made her debut at the Metropolitan Opera in 1940 and was one of its leading artists through 1961. She was known for her large, flexible silvery voice, particularly in the high-lying soprano roles of Richard Strauss. She was equally well known for her lyrical portrayals of Mozart's heroines, many in collaboration with conductors Kurt Adler, Bruno Walter. Beyond Mozart and Strauss her repertoire was quite varied.

She was noted for success in the music of Wagner, Alban Berg, Giacomo Puccini and also in French opera. Steber sang the lead in the world premiere of the American opera Vanessa by Samuel Barber. She was also featured in a number of Metropolitan Opera premieres, including Strauss's Arabella, Mozart's Die Entführung aus dem Serail, and Berg's Wozzeck.

Outside the Metropolitan her career included a 1953 engagement at the Bayreuth Wagner Festival, where her performance as Elsa in Lohengrin was highly acclaimed and recorded by Decca Records. She sang with Arturo Toscanini in his 1944 NBC Symphony broadcast of Beethoven's Fidelio. In 1954 at the Florence May Festival she sang a celebrated performance of Minnie in Puccini's La fanciulla del West with conductor Dimitri Mitropoulos. With Serge Koussevitzky and the Boston Symphony Orchestra she sang the world premiere in 1948 of Samuel Barber's Knoxville: Summer of 1915, a work which she commissioned.

Beyond the opera, Steber was popular with radio and television audiences in frequent appearances on The Voice of Firestone, The Bell Telephone Hour and other programs. Her extensive recording output included many popular ballads and operetta tunes in addition to arias, art songs and complete operas.

In 1973 she recorded a live album of arias and songs for RCA Red Seal at the Continental Baths in New York City where a young Bette Midler was then a regular performer. At the same time she was still heard in recital at Carnegie Hall and sang a noted late-career performance of Strauss's Four Last Songs with James Levine and the Cleveland Orchestra.

While she was known as an artist of the highest standards, her musical life was often disrupted by marital discord and alcohol.

Upon retiring from singing, she taught on the faculty of the Cleveland Institute of Music and the Juilliard School& Master classes in Philadelphia Music Academy in 1975 and maintained a private voice studio. A graduate of the New England Conservatory of Music (1938), she also coached a limited number of students (vocal performance majors) there in a "master class" format at least in the years 1975-1977.  She established the Eleanor Steber Vocal Foundation with an annual contest to assist young singers in launching their careers. Her many recordings are still available, as are audio and visual tapes of her radio and television broadcasts for The Voice of Firestone. Her papers are held by Houghton Library at Harvard University.

Personal life
Steber struggled at times with asthma and alcoholism. She was married twice. Her first husband was pianist Edwin Lee Bilby. Her second husband was Colonel Gordon Andrews, whom she married in 1958, at the time she created the role of Vanessa at the Metropolitan Opera. Andrews managed her career and started the STAND record company, a joint venture that produced numerous recordings of Steber's performances. They were married for nine years. She had three stepchildren: Marsha Andrews, an opera singer who studied with her at the Cleveland Institute of Music and in New York and who also sang at the Metropolitan Opera for 12 seasons; Gordon Andrews Jr., retiree from GM, now deceased; and Michelle Andrews Oesterle, a choral conductor, singer and founder of the very successful Manhattan Girls Chorus.

Death
She died on October 3, 1990, in Langhorne, Pennsylvania, following heart valve surgery and is interred at Greenwood Cemetery, Wheeling, West Virginia.

Selected discography
Eleanor Steber sings Richard Strauss; VAI Audio; Karl Böhm (1st work), James Levine (2nd work, encore), conductors. Recorded: Munich, June 4, 1953, (1st work); Cleveland, May 5, 1970 (2nd work, encore)
Eleanor Steber sings Mozart – Selections Voice of Firestone; VAI Audio; Robert Lawrence (1st–6th works), Wilfred Pelletier (7th) or Howard Barlow (8th–10th), conductor. Recorded Apr., 1960 (1st–6th works); from Voice of Firestone radio broadcasts, 1946–1952 (remainder).
Eleanor Steber, her first recordings (1940); VAI Audio; Wilfrid Pelletier, conductor; Recorded May 30–31, 1940 and June 25–26, 1940, Town Hall, New York City; and June 17, 1940, Academy of Music, Philadelphia.
The Eleanor Steber Collection. Vol. 1, The Early Career, 1938–1951; Armand Tokatyan (3rd and 5th works); George Cehanovsky (6th work); Leonard Warren (6th work); Recorded 1938–1951.
Puccini – Madama Butterfly; Sony Classical/ Columbia; Jean Madeira, Suzuki ; Metropolitan Opera Orchestra and Chorus; "1949 Metropolitan Opera Association Production".
Samuel Barber – Knoxville: Summer of 1915 (Columbia Masterworks). Dumbarton Oaks Chamber Orchestra, William Strickland, conductor. Recorded November 7, 1950.
Wagner – Lohengrin; Teldec; Bayreuth Festival; Josef Keilberth, conductor. Live 1953.
Puccini – La Fanciulla del West 1954 June 15 live performance at the Florence Maggio Musicale, Dimitri Mitropoulos conductor, with Mario Del Monaco and Gian Giacomo Guelfi (2008 CD release on Regis Records RRC2080)
Samuel Barber – Vanessa; RCA Victor; Metropolitan Opera Orchestra and Chorus ; Dmitri Mitropoulos, conductor; Recorded February and April 1958 in Manhattan Center.
Eleanor Steber Live at the Continental Baths;RCA Victor; Recorded October 4, 1973.

References

Sources
 Eleanor Steber collection, ca. 1920–1990, Houghton Library, Harvard University.
 Steber, Eleanor by Martin Bernheimer, in 'The New Grove Dictionary of Opera', ed. Stanley Sadie (London, 1992) 
 Peter G. Davis in his book American Opera Singers offers a fine portrait of Steber.
 Eleanor Steber: an autobiography with Marcia Sloat; Wordsworth, 1992.
 He loves me when I sing: remembering Eleanor Steber; Judith Buffington and other friends; Cottrell Printing, 1993.
 Mozart: Eight Operatic Arias for the Soprano Voice by Rita Beatie. G. Schirmer, Inc. 80 pages. This compilation, authored by one of Steber's students, provides annotated music scores documenting Steber's interpretations of eight Mozart arias.

External links
  by Carrie Jacobs-Bond (1862–1946)
  – lyrics by Frank Lebby Stanton (1857–1927) and music by Oley Speaks (1874–1948)
 Eleanor Steber photographs, ca. 1935–1977, digital.lib.buffalo.edu; accessed July 18, 2015.
 Interview with Eleanor Steber, March 16, 1985

1914 births
1990 deaths
American operatic sopranos
Cleveland Institute of Music faculty
People from Langhorne, Pennsylvania
Musicians from Wheeling, West Virginia
Burials at Greenwood Cemetery (Wheeling, West Virginia)
Women music educators
20th-century American women opera singers
Winners of the Metropolitan Opera Auditions of the Air
American women academics
Singers from Pennsylvania
Classical musicians from Pennsylvania